Karthane is a river of Brandenburg, Germany. It flows into the Stepenitz in Wittenberge.

See also
List of rivers of Brandenburg

Rivers of Brandenburg
Rivers of Germany